The Akwambo festival is celebrated by the chiefs and peoples of Agona Nyakrom and Agona Swedru in the Central region of Ghana. The festival is celebrated in the month of August every year.

References

 

Folk festivals in Ghana